Teodora Albon (born 2 December 1977 in Cisnădie, Romania) is a Romanian football referee. Albon started her refereeing career in 2000 while still playing for Clujana Cluj-Napoca, where she was coached by her husband, Mirel Albon, a former Liga I assistant referee.

She refereed the 2009 UEFA Women's Under-19 Championship Final between Sweden and England. She refereed (accompanied by a team of three Romanian match officials – assistants Petruța Iugulescu and Mihaela Țepușa, and fourth official Cristina Dorcioman) of the 2013 UEFA Women's Champions League Final at Stamford Bridge in London, where VfL Wolfsburg beat Lyon 1–0 in regular time, and also officiated at two matches during UEFA Women's Euro 2013. She also refereed the 2011–12 UEFA Women's Champions League semi-final between Lyon and Turbine Potsdam, and the 2012–13 UEFA Women's Champions League quarter-final, between Arsenal and Torres. Additionally, she was a referee for the 2015 FIFA Women's World Cup in Canada.

References

External links
Profile on Liga I
Football Tactics and Lineups Database profile
Profile at footballzz.com
Profile at Footballdatabase.eu
Video interview at UEFA

Living people
1977 births
People from Sibiu County
Romanian football referees
FIFA Women's World Cup referees
Women association football referees